The 2018 Toronto shooting, known locally as the Danforth shooting, was a mass shooting that occurred on Danforth Avenue in the Greektown neighbourhood of Toronto, Ontario, Canada on the night of July 22, 2018. Faisal Hussain killed two people and wounded thirteen using a Smith & Wesson M&P .40-calibre handgun. He died by suicide after a shootout with Toronto Police Service (TPS) officers. Despite a year long investigation, authorities were unable to determine a motive for the shooting.

Incident
Around 10:00 p.m. EDT on July 22, 2018, Faisal Hussain walked along Toronto's busy Danforth Avenue in the Greektown area of the city, randomly shooting pedestrians before opening fire on crowded restaurants. The incident began around Danforth and Logan avenues near the restaurant named Christina's. Witnesses described 10 to 15 blasts similar to firecrackers, while others reported hearing gunshots and seeing a man holding a gun. Further along the Danforth at Chester Avenue, witnesses said they saw a man shooting from a sidewalk into another restaurant named Demetre's. The shooter continued to walk westbound on Danforth Avenue towards Hampton Avenue, where witnesses said the shooter crossed the street from the north side to the south side and fired into the 7Numbers restaurant near Bowden Street where one victim was shot. The shooter chose not to shoot certain people he encountered, telling one man, "Don't worry, I'm not going to shoot you." TPS officers responded to calls from witnesses and located the gunman on Bowden Street and initiated a shootout with the suspect. The gunman ran back to Danforth Avenue where he was found dead.

At the corner of Danforth and Logan avenues, police cordoned off an area from bystanders and detonated an unidentified package for undisclosed reasons.

Victims

18-year-old Reese Fallon and 10-year-old Julianna Kozis were killed in the attack.

Thirteen others suffered gunshot wounds, ranging in age from 17 to 59. Toronto Paramedic Services transported eight victims to trauma centres – including four people to St. Michael's Hospital, three to Sunnybrook Health Sciences Centre and one to The Hospital for Sick Children. St. Michael's reported it was treating five patients. Three of them underwent immediate lifesaving surgery after the shooting and the others were in serious but stable condition.

Two gunshot victims were treated at the nearby Michael Garron Hospital and were in stable condition. Five other patients were treated for issues related to the shooting, but were not shot.

Perpetrator
The Special Investigations Unit (SIU) identified the perpetrator as 29-year-old Faisal Hussain.

Hussain was born to parents of Pakistani origin according to people who knew the family. In a public statement, Hussain's parents said that he was psychotic and depressed throughout his life. In 2010, Hussain told a friend that he was seeing a psychiatrist about these problems. A former teacher described him as "very disturbed" and recounted having to take him to a psychiatric facility after he started carving into his face with the blade of a pencil sharpener. Another former teacher called the police after Hussain allegedly said, without prompting, that "it would be really cool to kill someone." His family had been struggling through the death of his sister in a car accident and his brother's ongoing coma after an overdose or a stroke. According to a neighbour, Hussain was not religious and declined to participate in Friday prayers. According to his brother, Hussain had "started attending a mosque with his father, but did not seem that interested in religion."

In 2010, Hussain was investigated by TPS under the provincial Mental Health Act. On July 24, 2018, the Ministry of Public Safety said there is currently no connection between him and national security. He was not on any federal watchlists. Some news reports suggested Hussain was inspired by Elliot Rodger and the incel ideology.

Investigation

In the immediate aftermath of the shooting, police did not identify a motive, saying that they were investigating "every possible motive, including terrorism." In June 2019, authorities finished a year long investigation and could not determine a motive for the attack. Regarding the motive, Toronto police chief Mark Saunders said "we may never know why".

On July 23, police executed a search warrant at Hussain's residence in the Thorncliffe Park neighbourhood of the city. A day later, CBS News published that, according to a law enforcement source, Hussain visited ISIL websites which may have expressed his support for the Islamic militant group; he was also speculated to have previously lived in Afghanistan and Pakistan, but the investigation has revealed that his actions did not appear to be directed by ISIL. On July 25, Amaq News Agency, citing a "security source", stated that he was "from the soldiers of Islamic State", yet Toronto Police said there was no evidence of an ISIL connection. Amarnath Amarasingam of the London-based Institute for Strategic Dialogue doubted Amaq's claim and said it may have been prompted by the CBS News article.

Since Hussain was found dead after a shootout, the SIU looked into whether he was shot by police or shot himself. On July 23, it removed a police cruiser from the scene and said the two officers in it were being investigated for their roles in the shootout. Hussain's handgun was also seized. On July 25, a police source told CBC News that Hussain died by suicide. The same day, a police source told CP24 that the gun was from the United States and had been obtained from a "gang-related source". A police source later told CTV News it had been stolen in 2015 during a Saskatoon burglary. It may have come to Hussain from his brother who lived at a house in Toronto's eastern suburb of Pickering where 33 guns were seized in 2017.

Aftermath

Residents and business owners in the area started a crowdfunding campaign for funeral expenses of victims who died. Meanwhile, the Canadian Blood Services said that they were closely monitoring response efforts and were encouraging donations in the aftermath of the shooting.

The Toronto International Film Festival cancelled an event to promote its planned film slate out of respect for those affected by the shooting.

Reactions 
Canadian Prime Minister Justin Trudeau and Minister of Public Safety and Emergency Preparedness Ralph Goodale tweeted their condemnation of the shooting and praise of the police. Ontario premier Doug Ford described the attack as "the most brazen shooting" of a year full of gun violence. Toronto Mayor John Tory called the shooting an "unspeakable act" and an attack on a city with a gun problem. He said he planned to discuss public safety and the legality of guns with provincial and federal officials.

The Ministry of Foreign Affairs of Greece expressed solidarity and condolence with the city's Greektown. Calvary Church, located near the site of the shooting, held a prayer vigil, joined by a congregation from the nearby Madinah Mosque.

The family of Faisal Hussain released a statement expressing "our deepest condolences to the families who are now suffering on account of our son's horrific actions".

Several sports teams and athletes showed their support on social media with the #TorontoStrong hashtag, which was also used after the van attack in North York City Centre in April 2018.

References

External links

2018 murders in Canada
2018 in Toronto
Attacks in Canada in 2018
Crime in Toronto
July 2018 crimes in North America
July 2018 events in Canada
Mass shootings in Canada
Spree shootings in Canada
Murder in Ontario
Deaths by firearm in Ontario
2018 mass shootings in Canada
2018 disasters in Canada
Terrorist incidents in 2018
Terrorism in Canada
Terrorist incidents in Canada in the 2010s 
Terrorist incidents in North America in 2018